KKTX may refer to:

 KKTX (AM), a radio station (1360 AM) licensed to Corpus Christi, Texas, United States
 KKTX-FM, a radio station (96.1 FM) licensed to Kilgore, Texas, United States